Marchington Woodlands is a village and former civil parish, now in the parish of Marchington, in the East Staffordshire district, in the county of Staffordshire, England. It has a church and a village hall.  The local first school was closed in the 1990s and the building was converted into a private home. Marchington Woodlands consists mostly of farms and cottages. it is often Referred to by locals as The Woodlands. It is located near Uttoxeter. In 1931 the parish had a population of 273.

History
Marchington Woodlands became a village in 1859 with the opening of the Parish church.

Governance
Marchington Woodlands is part of the Crown ward in East Staffordshire and is represented by the Conservative Charles Hardwick. And the Dove ward in Staffordshire County council and is represented by Bob Fraser who is also Conservative.

Marchington Woodlands is part of the Burton constituency in the House of Commons. Prior to Brexit in 2020 it was part of the West Midlands constituency and was represented by 6 MEPs.

Geography
Marchington Woodlands is set out and its spread out of an area of around 3 miles. There are 2 areas called Scounslow Green and Gorsty Hill. The area around Marchington Woodlands is Hilly and there are several forests.

Marchington Woodlands became a parish in 1866, on 1 April 1934 the parish was abolished and merged with Marchington, Anslow, Hanbury, Newborough and Tatenhill.

Climate

Public services
Waste collection services are provided by East Staffordshire Borough Council. Water and sewage services are provided by South Staffordshire Water and the Sewage Treatment Works is in Uttoxeter. The distribution network operator for electricity is Central Networks, better known as E.ON UK.

Marchington Woodlands uses a Stoke-on-Trent (ST) postcode and the Postal Town is Uttoxeter. The nearest library is located in Uttoxeter.

Marchington Woodlands uses two telephone area codes, Burton upon Trent (01283) and Uttoxeter (01889).

The nearest police and fire stations are in Uttoxeter.

Health
The village lies in the South Staffordshire NHS trust area. The village does not have its own doctor's surgery or pharmacy The nearest GP's surgeries can be found in Uttoxeter. The Queens Hospital at Burton-upon-Trent is the area's local hospital. It has an Accident and Emergency Department.

Crime
In 2009 there was an average of 2.9 crimes per 1,000 people for the Bagot and Marchington Neighbourhood area. In 2010 the figure was down to 2.5 crimes per head. The most common type of crime is anti-social or Burglary behaviour. in January 2011 there were no reported crimes in Marchington Woodlands.

Religion
Marchington Woodlands lies in the Anglican parish of Marchington Woodlands and the Roman Catholic parish of St Mary, Uttoxeter. In 2001 89% described themselves as Christian and 11% described themselves as Not-Religious.

St. John's church, Marchington Woodlands

The only place of Worship in Marchington Woodlands is St. John's church, which is a Church of England parish church.

Education
Marchington Woodlands uses the Uttoxeter Middle school system

There was previously a primary school that closed in the 1981. Now students attend the primary school in Marchington. After students attend Oldfields Hall Middle School and then Thomas Alleyne's High School both of which are in Uttoxeter.

From 1937 to 2021 There was Private Preparatory school called Denstone College Preparatory School at Smallwood Manor which is the feeder school to Denstone College.

Transport
There are no bus routes and all roads serving the village are single track roads.

The nearest bus routes are in Birch Cross. The nearest Railway station is Uttoxeter.

The nearest airports are East Midlands (21 Miles) and Birmingham (29 Miles).

Media
The local newspapers covering the area are The Uttoxeter Advertiser and The Uttoxeter Post and Times; also on a wider area scale there is The Sentinel from Stoke-On-Trent and Burton Mail from Burton-On-Trent.

Marchington Woodlands receives both BBC West Midlands and ITV Central television. Local radio stations in the area include BBC Radio Derby and Capital East Midlands.

References

External links

 Marchington and Marchington Woodlands community web pages

Villages in Staffordshire
Former civil parishes in Staffordshire
Woodlands